A transit watchdog is an individual or group that provides public comment regarding public transit operations. Transit watchdogs attract a variety of contributors, from transit users to railfans, who offer feedback about service, operations, and funding matters.

See also
 List of urban transit advocacy organisations
Transit district

External links
Straphanger's Campaign (New York City's MTA)
Urban Transit (Washington State)
SEPTA Watch (Philadelphia's SEPTA)

Public transportation in the United States
Transport websites